The Nevada general election, 2014 was held on Tuesday, November 4, 2014, throughout Nevada.

The active political parties participated in the 2014 election were the two major political parties, the Democratic Party and the Republican Party as well as the minor political parties of the Independent American Party of Nevada, the Nevada Green Party, and the Libertarian Party of Nevada. There are also unaffiliated, non-partisan candidates.

United States House of Representatives

All of Nevada's four seats in the United States House of Representatives were up for election in 2014.

Governor

Incumbent Republican Governor Brian Sandoval ran for re-election to a second term in office and won. He was challenged by Democratic nominee Bob Goodman, a former State Economic Development Commissioner and Independent American nominee David Lory VanDerBeek, a family therapist.

Lieutenant governor
Incumbent Republican Lieutenant Governor Brian Krolicki was prevented from running for re-election to a third term in office due to constitutional lifetime term limits.

Republican primary

Candidates
 Chris Dyer
 Mark Hutchison, state senator
 Sue Lowden, former chairwoman of the Nevada Republican Party, former state senator and candidate for the U.S. Senate in 2010

Polling

Results

Democratic primary

Candidates
 Lucy Flores, state assemblywoman
 Harley Kulkin

Results

Independent American

Candidates
 Mike Little

General election

Polling

Results

Attorney general

Incumbent Democratic Attorney General Catherine Cortez Masto was prevented from running for re-election to a third term in office due to constitutional lifetime term limits.

Until the 2022 Nevada gubernatorial election, this was the most recent time a Republican won a Nevada statewide election while carrying neither Clark nor Washoe Counties.

Democratic
 Ross Miller, Secretary of State of Nevada and son of former governor Bob Miller

Republican
 Adam Laxalt, attorney, son of former U.S. Senator Pete Domenici and grandson of former governor Paul Laxalt

Independent American
 Jonathan Hansen, attorney

General election

Polling

Results

Secretary of State

Incumbent Democratic Secretary of State Ross Miller was prevented from running for re-election to a third term in office due to constitutional lifetime term limits.

Democratic
 Kate Marshall, Nevada State Treasurer

Republican
 Barbara Cegavske State Senator and former state assemblywoman

General election

Polling

Results

Treasurer
Incumbent Democratic State Treasurer Kate Marshall was prevented from running for re-election to a third term in office due to constitutional lifetime term limits.

Democratic
 Kim Wallin, Nevada State Controller

Republican
 Dan Schwartz, businessman and candidate for Nevada's 4th congressional district in 2012

Independent American
 Kress Cave

General election

Polling

Results

Controller
Incumbent Democratic Controller Kim Wallin was prevented from running for re-election to a third term in office due to constitutional lifetime term limits.

Democratic
Declared
 Andrew Martin, state assemblyman

Disqualified
 Michael Schaefer, perennial candidate and former San Diego, California City Councilman (disqualified by the Nevada Supreme Court because he did not meet the residency requirements)

Republican primary

Candidates
 Cort Arlint, licensed tax attorney, CPA and university accounting professor
 Barry Herr, CPA, former adjunct professor at the University of Nevada, Las Vegas and nominee for Controller in 2010
 Ron Knecht, Regent of the University of Nevada, Reno and former state assemblyman

Results

Independent American
 Tom Jones

General election

Results

State Legislature

Nevada Senate

Eleven out of twenty-one seats in the Nevada Senate were up for election in 2014. Six of the seats were currently held by Republicans and five were held by Democrats. Democrats held a one-seat majority in the state senate. Names appearing in bold were on the November general election ballot either through winning the June 10th primary or having no primary election.

Polling
District 8

District 9

Election results

Nevada Assembly

All 42 seats in the Nevada Assembly were up for election in 2014. Democrats held 26 seats, Republicans held 15 seats and there was one vacancy.

State Judicial Branch

Supreme Court Seat B
Incumbent Justice Kristina Pickering has filed to run for re-election without any opposition.

Supreme Court Seat D
Incumbent Justice Mark Gibbons has filed to run for re-election without any opposition.

Ballot Initiatives

Intermediate Appellate Court
Senate Joint Resolution No. 14 of the 76th Session creates an intermediate appellate court between the District Court level and the Nevada Supreme Court. After passing through the 76th Session in 2011 with a vote of 48 in favor, 13 against and two excused, and the 77th Session in 2013 with a vote of 61 in favor, none against and two excused, Senate Joint Resolution No. 14 will be placed on the 2014 General Election ballot for popular vote to amend the Constitution of Nevada.

The Education Initiative
The Education Initiative was on the 2014 ballot in the state of Nevada as an indirect initiated state statute. The measure seeks to implement a 2 percent margins tax on businesses in the state and requires that the proceeds of the tax be used to fund the operation of public schools in Nevada for kindergarten through grade 12. Initiative Petition No. 1 was forwarded to the Nevada Legislature from the Secretary of State's office after qualifying for the ballot for legislative action. The Legislature did not act on IP No. 1 within the framework pursuant to Article 19, section 2 of the Nevada Constitution and automatically went on the ballot in 2014.

Mining Tax
Senate Joint Resolution No. 15 of the 76th Session proposes to amend the Nevada Constitution to remove the separate tax rate and manner of assessing and distributing the tax on mines and the proceeds of mines. After passing through the 76th Session in 2011 with a vote of 40 in favor and 23 against, and the 77th Session in 2013 with a vote of 43 in favor, 19 against and one excused, Senate Joint Resolution No. 15 will be placed on the 2014 General Election ballot for popular vote to amend the Constitution of Nevada.

References

 
2014 elections in the United States by state